Events in 2015 in anime.

Awards
9th Seiyu Awards (held in 2015, awarded works from 2014)
10th Seiyu Awards (held in 2016, awarded works from 2015)

Conventions
 January 16–18 - Otakon Vegas 2015
 March - AnimeJapan 2015

Releases

Television series 
A list of anime television series that debuted between January 1 and December 31, 2015.

Animation films 
List of anime film releases that debuts through theater screening from January 1 - December 31, 2015.

Original net animation 
List of streamed anime series debuts from January 1, 2015 through December 31, 2015

OVA/OAV 
List of anime that are debuted as DVD, Blu-ray, and other media releases in 2015.

Highest-grossing films
The top ten anime films of 2015 by worldwide gross are as follows:

Deaths
October 27 - Miyu Matsuki, voice actress

See also
2015 in Japanese television
2015 in Austria
2015 in French television
2015 in German television
2015 in Greece
2015 in Russia
2015 in television
2015 in animation
2015 in manga

References

External links 
Japanese animated works of the year, listed in the IMDb

Years in anime
anime
anime